Zotz is a surname. Notable people with the surname include:
 Birgit Zotz (born 1979), Austrian writer and cultural anthropologist
  (1899–1967), German archaeologist and prehistorian
 Volker Zotz (born 1956), Austrian philosopher

German-language surnames